Pselnophorus albitarsella is a moth of the family Pterophoridae that is found in India.

The larvae are white with a few long hairs scattered about the body. They burrow into the shoots of a common jungle plant. Pupation takes place in a pupa which is suspended by the tail from the underside of a leaf.

References

Moths described in 1900
Oidaematophorini
Endemic fauna of India
Moths of Asia